Toensing is a surname of Germanic origin.

Those bearing it include:

 Craig Edward Toensing (born 1937), past chair of Connecticut State Board of Education
 Richard Toensing (born 1940), American musician & educator
 Victoria Toensing (born 1941), American jurist
 Gale Courey Toensing  (born 1944), American journalist with Indian Country Today

References